Colin Harper (born 1968) is an Irish music journalist.

Colin Harper may also refer to:

Colin Harper (conductor) (1933–2004), Scottish-Australian conductor
Colin Harper (footballer) (1946–2018), English footballer and manager